Limonia acidissima is the only species within the monotypic genus Limonia. Common names for the species in English include wood-apple and elephant-apple. It is sometimes also called monkey fruit.

Description
The leaves are pinnate, with 5-7 leaflets, each leaflet 25–35 mm long and 10–20 mm broad, with a citrus-scent when crushed. The flowers are white and have five petals. The fruit is a berry 5–9 cm diameter, and may be sweet or sour. It has a very hard rind which can be difficult to crack open, it appears greenish-brown in colour from outside and contains sticky brown pulp and small white seeds. The fruit looks similar in appearance to the Bael fruit (Aegle marmelos). It contains considerable amount of protein, carbohydrate, iron, fat, calcium, Vit-B & C etc. 100 g of ripe fruit pulp contains up to 49 KCal.

Taxonomy
A number of other species formerly included in the genus are now treated in the related genera Atalantia, Citropsis, Citrus, Glycosmis, Luvunga, Murraya, Micromelum, Naringi, Pamburus, Pleiospermium, Severinia, Skimmia, Swinglea, and Triphasia.

Distribution
Limonia acidissima is native to India (including the Andaman Islands), Bangladesh, and Sri Lanka. The species has also been introduced to Indochina and Malesia.

Uses

The fruit is used to make a fruit juice with astringent properties and jams. Ripe fruit can be used as pickle (mashed with green chili pepper, sugar and salt only). Another species of this fruits are considered auspicious to be offered to Shiva and Ganesha in pujas. A majority of Hindu temples will have a sacred tree within its compound and is known as the Sthala Vriksha.

In Myanmar, the wood is used to make the distinctive local face cream thanaka.

Nutrition

References

External links

Purdue-hort_edu: The Wood Apple
Pandanus Database - Limonia

Aurantioideae
Fruits originating in Asia
Citrus
Flora of India (region)
Flora of the Andaman Islands
Trees of Sri Lanka
Plants used in Ayurveda
Fruit trees
Trees in Buddhism
Plants in Hinduism